Seamus McGarvey, ASC, BSC (born 29 June 1967) is a cinematographer from Armagh, Northern Ireland.
He lives in Tuscany, Italy.

He has received two Academy Award nominations for his cinematography, on Joe Wright's 2007 drama Atonement and his 2012 adaptation of Leo Tolstoy's novel Anna Karenina.

In addition to the Oscar nominations, McGarvey won the British Society of Cinematographers (B.S.C.) award for Anna Karenina and for Nocturnal Animals, as well as a nomination for Atonement, and earned BAFTA noms for Atonement, Anna Karenina and Nocturnal Animals. He received A.S.C. nods for Atonement and Anna Karenina. Atonement earned him nominations for the British Independent Film Award, the Chicago Film Critics Association and the Online Film Critics Society, and he received the top honor from the Phoenix Film Critics Society.

McGarvey has won three Evening Standard British Film Awards for Atonement, Anna Karenina and Stephen Daldry's The Hours and six Irish Film & Television Awards for Atonement, Anna Karenina, Sahara and We Need to Talk About Kevin, Nocturnal Animals and The Greatest Showman. In 2004, he was awarded the Royal Photographic Society's prestigious Lumiere Medal, with Jack Cardiff, Freddie Francis, Roger Deakins and Ridley Scott, for contributions to the art of cinematography.

Life and career
McGarvey was born in Armagh, Northern Ireland. He began his career as a still photographer, before attending film school at the University of Westminster in London.

Upon graduating in 1988, he began shooting short films and documentaries, including Skin, which was nominated for a Royal Television Society Cinematography Award, and Atlantic, directed by Sam Taylor-Wood. The latter project, an experimental, three-screen projected film created in 1997, earned Taylor-Wood a nomination for the 1998 Turner Prize and led to an ongoing collaboration between McGarvey and the director.

His four dozen credits as director of photography include Joss Whedon's superhero film The Avengers; Lynne Ramsay's We Need to Talk About Kevin; Oliver Stone's World Trade Center; Gary Winick's Charlotte's Web; John Hamburg's Along Came Polly; Stephen Frears' High Fidelity; Mike Nichols' Wit; Michael Apted's Enigma; Michael Winterbottom's Butterfly Kiss; and two projects marking actors' directorial debuts: Tim Roth's The War Zone and Alan Rickman's The Winter Guest. He served as cinematographer on the pilot for the TV series The No. 1 Ladies Detective Agency, directed by Anthony Minghella.

He reunited with director Wright for his 2009 drama The Soloist, and filmmaker Sam Taylor-Wood (now Sam Taylor-Johnson) on her acclaimed 2008 drama Nowhere Boy, her 2011 short, James Bond Supports International Women's Dayand the Death Valley segment of the 2006 erotic drama Destricted. Following his work on Godzilla, he teamed with Taylor-Johnson on her big screen adaptation, and Hollywood directorial debut, of the bestselling novel Fifty Shades of Grey. He has photographed Pan, The Accountant, Nocturnal Animals, Life, The Greatest Showman, Greta, and Bad Times at the El Royale, and The Nevers.

His documentary work includes Lost Angels: Skid Row Is My Home, which followed his work on Wright's The Soloist, and filmed in the same locales; Harry Dean Stanton: Partly Fiction; Rolling Stones: Tip of the Tongue; and The Name of This Film Is Dogme95.

Supplementing his work on features and telefilms, McGarvey has photographed and directed over 100 music videos for various artists, including Coldplay, Paul McCartney, Dusty Springfield, The Rolling Stones, U2, and Robbie Williams.

In 2015, he was awarded an Honorary Doctor of Laws from Dundee University and an Honorary Doctor of Fine Arts from the University of Ulster. He is an Honorary Fellow of Edinburgh College of Art. He is featured in the book In Conversation with Cinematographers by David A. Ellis and in the book Ballinger, Alexander; New Cinematographers (2004) .

McGarvey was meant to serve as cinematographer on Spider-Man: No Way Home, but exited after contracting COVID-19 and was replaced with Mauro Fiore.

Filmography

Film

Television

Short film
1997 - Flying Saucer Rock'n'Roll
2016 - Kitty

Further reading
 Ballinger, Alexander; New Cinematographers (2004)

References

External links
 
 American Cinematographer Article
 Moving Image Arts website: Detailed interview with Seamus McGarvey

1967 births
Cinematographers from Northern Ireland
Film directors from Northern Ireland
Living people
People educated at St Patrick's Grammar School, Armagh
People from Armagh (city)